This is a list of films which have placed number one at the weekend box office in the United States during 1998.

Number-one films

Highest-grossing films

Calendar gross
Highest-grossing films of 1998 by calendar gross:

In-year release

See also
 List of American films — American films by year
 Lists of box office number-one films

References

Chronology

1998
United States
1998 in American cinema